Michael Roger Perfit (born 1949) is an American geologist who is currently an emeritus distinguished professor at the University of Florida.

Perfit grew up on Long Island, New York where he got his love for the ocean that has continued today in his personal and professional life.  He attended St. Lawrence University in upstate New York where he graduated with a BS in Geology in 1971.  He first entered the graduate program at Lamont Doherty Geological Observatory/Columbia University as a student of Maurice Ewing and later, Bruce Heezen receiving an M. Phil. in Marine Geology in 1974. He continued to obtain a Ph.D. at Lamont/Columbia in Geochemistry in 1977 under the mentorship of Drs. Robert Kay and W. Ian Ridley.

After graduating, Perfit became a Research Fellow in geochemistry at the Australian National University in Canberra, Australia for 5 years where he investigated island arc volcanoes and submarine ridges in the southwest Pacific. Perfit became Assistant Professor in the Department of Geology at the University of Florida in Gainesville in 1982. He worked his way through the academic ranks to become a Full Professor and  served as Chair of the Department from 2007 to 2013.  His research has primarily focused on submarine petrology, volcanism and tectonics. Most of his fieldwork and research has been done on the bottom of the ocean or in geochemistry labs investigating the petrogenesis of island arcs, mid-ocean ridge basalts and oceanic spreading centers.  Perfit has participated on 25 oceanographic expeditions, taken more than 40 dives to depths up to 12,000 feet in the Human Occupied deep-sea submersible HOV ALVIN and more recently has used a variety of Remotely Operated Vehicles (ROVs) to study and sample the seafloor. Much of his research over the past three decades has been focused on the northern East Pacific Rise, the southern Juan de Fuca Ridge, and Axial Seamount where he was part multidisciplinary research teams that found and studied the first recorded historic eruptions on these mid-ocean ridges.

Perfit has served as the UNOLS Chair of the Deep Submergence Science Committee (DeSSC) and as a Trustee of the Consortium for Ocean Leadership (C)L). At the University of Florida was selected as an Outstanding Teacher, Term Professor (twice) and  Research Foundation Professor, (2011-2014) . He has also held visiting research fellowships at Cornell University, the University of Tasmania, the Institut de Physique du Globe (Paris), the Monterey Bay Aquarium Research Institute, and the Australian National University. He is a Fellow of the Geological Society of America, elected in 2008 for "his distinguished contributions in marine geology and igneous petrology." He was elected as a Fellow of the American Geophysical Union (AGU) in 2013.

He has published over 150 professional papers and articles as well as two books – one is a children’s book written and illustrated with Perfit’s college roommate, Don Brown, - entitled “Older Than Dirt: A Wild but True History of Earth”. The other is an academic book that focuses mainly on the exploration of the deep ocean floor, mid-ocean ridges, deep sea volcanism and hydrothermalism, and the structure and composition of oceanic crust. The highly illustrated book is entitled “Discovering the Deep: A Photographic Atlas of the Seafloor” by Jeff Karson, Deb Kelley, Dan Fornari, Mike Perfit and Tim Shank.

.Selected publications
 
  In 2016, this book received a PROSE Award from the Association of American Publishers.

References

External links

 Education and Outreach: Best in show
 Scientist at work: I'm a geologist who's dived dozens of times to explore submarine volcanoes

1949 births
Living people
American geologists
Columbia University alumni
Fellows of the Geological Society of America
St. Lawrence University alumni
University of Florida faculty